The 1942 Putney by-election was held on 8 May 1942.  The by-election was held due to the death of the incumbent Conservative MP, Marcus Samuel.  It was won by the Conservative candidate Hugh Linstead.

References

Putney by-election
Putney,1942
Putney by-election
Putney,1942
Putney